Dora Lake may refer to:
Australia
Lake Dora (Tasmania)
Lake Dora (Western Australia)
United States
Dora Lake, a lake in Le Sueur County, Minnesota